Gymnallabes is a genus of airbreathing catfishes found in Africa. Gymnallabes species are thin and eel-like for burrowing.

Species 
There are currently two recognized species in this genus:
 Gymnallabes nops T. R. Roberts & D. J. Stewart, 1976
 Gymnallabes typus Günther, 1867

References

Clariidae
Catfish genera
Fish of Africa
Fish of Cameroon
Fish of Equatorial Guinea
Freshwater fish genera
Taxa named by Albert Günther